The father-in-law of Europe is a sobriquet which has been used to refer to two European monarchs of the late 19th and early 20th century: Christian IX of Denmark and Nicholas I of Montenegro, both on account of their children's marriages to foreign princes and princesses. The fact that each was a monarch of moderate or modest power (and thus a marriage would not threaten the delicate balance of power) allowed them to marry some of their many children to heirs of greater fortunes across the continent.

Christian IX of Denmark
The children of King Christian IX (1818–1906) and Queen Louise (1817–1898) of Denmark included:
 King Frederick VIII of Denmark (1843–1912)
 Queen Alexandra of the United Kingdom (1844–1925) queen consort of King Edward VII
 King George I of Greece (1845–1913)
 Empress Maria Feodorovna of Russia (1847–1928) empress consort of Emperor Alexander III
 Crown Princess Thyra of Hanover (1853–1933), who married Crown Prince Ernest Augustus

Christian IX used to gather his children, children-in-law and grandchildren for the so-called Fredensborg days at Fredensborg Palace north of Copenhagen in the summer time. Christian and Louise's grandchildren included King George V of the United Kingdom, Emperor Nicholas II of Russia, King Constantine I of Greece and both King Haakon VII and his consort, Queen Maud of Norway.

Nicholas I of Montenegro
Nicholas I of Montenegro (1841–1921) was the father of:
 Zorka of Montenegro, who married King Peter I of Serbia
 Elena of Montenegro, who married King Victor Emmanuel III of Italy
 Anna of Montenegro, who married Prince Francis Joseph of Battenberg
 Two daughters who married brothers:
 Anastasia of Montenegro, who married Grand Duke Nicholas Nikolaevich of Russia after divorcing George, Duke of Leuchtenberg
 Milica of Montenegro, who married Grand Duke Peter Nikolaevich of Russia

See also
Queen Victoria was known as the grandmother of Europe.
Louis IX, Landgrave of Hesse-Darmstadt, the most recent common ancestor of all current European monarchs
John William Friso, Prince of Orange, the most recent common ancestor of all European monarchs, current and former
Royal descendants of John William Friso

References 

European royalty
Affinity (law)